Incorporated in 1980, the Arkansas Transit Association provides services for more than 200 members, consisting of urban and rural public transit systems and agencies, non-profit human service agencies, related commercial businesses and vendor associate members.

They offer a broad range of training programs in partnership with the Arkansas State Highway and Transportation Department.

References

External links
 

Public transportation in Arkansas